Virgins and Swallows is a 2008 Moroccan film directed by Moumen Smihi.

Synopsis 
Larbi Salmi, the son of a theologian, is introduced by his mother to Rabea, a beautiful 17 year old girl fascinated by love stories.

Cast 

 Najwa Azizi
 Oussama Ouahani
 Saïd Amel
 Khouloud
 Bahija Hachami
 Latefa Ahrrare
 Najat El Wadi

References

External links 
 

2008 films
Moroccan drama films